The 1989 Thriftway ATP Championship, also known as the Cincinnati Open, was a men's tennis tournament played on outdoor hard courts at the Lindner Family Tennis Center in Mason, Ohio in the United States that was part of the 1989 Nabisco Grand Prix. The tournament was held from August 14 through August 20, 1989. Fifth-seeded Brad Gilbert won the singles title.

Finals

Singles

 Brad Gilbert defeated  Stefan Edberg 6–4, 2–6, 7–6
 It was Gilbert's 4th title of the year and the 18th of his career.

Doubles

 Ken Flach /  Robert Seguso defeated  Pieter Aldrich /  Danie Visser 6–4, 6–4
 It was Flach's 2nd title of the year and the 26th of his career. It was Seguso's 2nd title of the year and the 26th of his career.

References

External links
 
 ITF tournament edition details
 ATP tournament profile

Cincinnati Open
Cincinnati Open
Cincinnati Masters
Cincin